Duhaime is a surname. Notable people with the surname include: 

Brandon Duhaime (born 1997), American ice hockey player
Chantal Duhaime (born 1990), Canadian curler
Éric Duhaime, (born 1969) Canadian politician
Greg Duhaime (1953-1992), Canadian track and field athlete
Michael DuHaime (born 1974), American public affairs executive
Yves Duhaime (born 1939), Canadian politician